Profunda may refer to:
 Profunda brachii
 Profunda femoris artery or vein